Christopher Boyes is an American sound engineer. He has won four Academy Awards and has been nominated for another eleven. He has worked on more than 100 films since 1991.

Academy Awards
Boyes has won four Academy Awards and has been nominated for another nine:

Wins
 Titanic (Best Sound Effects Editing) (1997) 
 Pearl Harbor (Best Sound Editing) (2001) 
 The Lord of the Rings: The Return of the King (Best Sound Mixing) (2003) 
 King Kong (Best Sound Mixing) (2005) 

Nominations
 Avatar: The Way of Water (Best Sound) (2022) 
 The Lord of the Rings: The Fellowship of the Ring (Best Sound) (2001) 
 The Lord of the Rings: The Two Towers (Best Sound) (2002) 
 Pirates of the Caribbean: The Curse of the Black Pearl (Best Sound Mixing and Best Sound Editing) (2003) 
 Pirates of the Caribbean: Dead Man's Chest (Best Sound Mixing and Best Sound Editing) (2006) 
 Iron Man (Best Sound Editing) (2008)
 Avatar (Best Sound Mixing and Best Sound Editing) (2009) 
 The Hobbit: The Desolation of Smaug (Best Sound Mixing) (2013)

References

External links

Year of birth missing (living people)
Living people
American audio engineers
Best Sound Mixing Academy Award winners
Best Sound Editing Academy Award winners
San Francisco State University alumni